Events from the year 1988 in Czechoslovakia. The year saw the candle demonstration in Bratislava.

Incumbents
President: Gustáv Husák.
Prime Minister:
Lubomír Štrougal (until 12 October)
Ladislav Adamec (from 12 October)

Events
25 March – The candle demonstration in Bratislava, led by the Catholic Church requesting religious freedom, is repressed with 190 people arrested.
21 August – Large anti-government demonstrations are held in Prague to mark the 20th anniversary of the Warsaw Pact invasion of Czechoslovakia.
11 October – A ČSA Tupolev Tu-134A (registration OK-AFB) landed hard at Ruzyne Airport; there were no casualties, but the aircraft was written off and flown to Piešťany where it served as a restaurant.

Popular culture

Film
Alice, directed and written by Jan Švankmajer, is released.
How Poets Are Enjoying Their Lives, directed by Dušan Klein is released.
The Jester and the Queen, directed by Věra Chytilová, is released in English.

Music
The band Půlnoc is formed by members of The Plastic People of the Universe. They perform in New York in July,

Births
9 December – Veronika Vítková, biathlete, winner of the silver medal at the 2014 Winter Olympics.

Deaths
3 January – John Dopyera, inventor of the resonator guitar (born 1893).
17 April – Daniel Rapant, historian (born 1897).
29 April – Jan Kapr, composer (born 1914).
21 December – Ján Cikker, composer (born 1911).

References

Citations

Bibliography

Czechoslovakia
1988 in Czechoslovakia
Czechoslovakia
1980s in Czechoslovakia
Years of the 20th century in Czechoslovakia